Ayelet Nahmias-Verbin (born 19 June 1970) is an Israeli lawyer and politician. She served as a member of the Knesset for the Zionist Union and the Labor Party between 2015 and 2019.

Biography
Ayelet Nahmias-Verbin was born and raised in Tel Aviv. She studied law at the Hebrew University of Jerusalem. She  lives in Jaffa and is married with three children. Her father-in-law is a former mayor of Ramat HaSharon.

Legal and political career
In 1991 she joined the Labor Party, and later became assistant legal advisor to Prime Minister Yitzhak Rabin. After Rabin was assassinated in 1995 she became chair of Tavlit, an irrigation company.

She placed 22nd on the Zionist Union list (an alliance of Labor and Hatnuah) for the 2015 Knesset elections, and was elected to the Knesset as the alliance won 24 seats. She did not contest the April 2019 elections and lost her seat.

References

External links

Living people
1970 births
Israeli Jews
People from Tel Aviv
Hebrew University of Jerusalem Faculty of Law alumni
Israeli lawyers
Israeli Labor Party politicians
Zionist Union politicians
Women members of the Knesset
Members of the 20th Knesset (2015–2019)
Israeli women lawyers
21st-century Israeli women politicians
Israeli people of Greek-Jewish descent